Peschanoye is a rural locality (a selo) in Limansky District, Astrakhan Oblast, Russia. The population was 382 as of 2010. There are 4 streets.

Geography 
Peschanoye is located 10 km northeast of Liman (the district's administrative centre) by road. Liman is the nearest rural locality.

References 

Rural localities in Limansky District